The 2015 Conference USA football season was part of the 2015 NCAA Division I FBS football season and played from August 2015 through January 2016. The 2015 football season marked the 21st season of the Conference USA's existence and 20th of football competition; although C-USA was established in 1995, it did not begin football competition until 1996.

Previous season

Marshall won the conference championship for the first time in the conference, defeating Louisiana Tech 26–23.

Membership

The Charlotte 49ers were a transitional Division I FBS member, joining from the FCS Atlantic 10 Conference. They replaced UAB in the East division for the 2015 season.

References